Memorial Manuel Galera was a single-day road bicycle race held annually in the Province of Granada, Spain from 1972 until 2004. From 1972 to 1979, the race was reserved for amateurs. The race was named in honor of Manuel Galera, a Spanish cyclist who died during the 1972 Vuelta a Andalucía.

Winners
Amateur editions highlighted in yellow.

References

Cycle races in Spain
Recurring sporting events established in 1972
1972 establishments in Spain
2004 disestablishments in Spain
Defunct cycling races in Spain
Recurring sporting events disestablished in 2004